Katrin Juliet Cartlidge (15 May 1961 – 7 September 2002) was an English actress. She first appeared on screen as Lucy Collins in the Channel 4 soap opera Brookside (1982–1983), before going on to win the 1997 Evening Standard Film Award for Best Actress for the Mike Leigh film Career Girls. Her other film appearances included Leigh's Naked (1993), Before the Rain (1994), Breaking the Waves (1996) and From Hell (2001).

Early life
Cartlidge was born in London, to Derek, an English father and Bobbi, a German-Jewish refugee mother. She was educated at the Parliament Hill School for Girls in Camden.

Work
Her work on Manchevski's Before the Rain and on No Man's Land made her well known in Bosnia and Herzegovina and the Balkans. Sophie, in Mike Leigh's Naked, was her first leading role. Cartlidge worked in two more Leigh films: in Career Girls she played one of the lead roles, Hannah, at the ages of both 20 and 30, and in Topsy Turvy she was a madam in a Paris brothel. She was due to play the lead role in Polish director Lech Majewski's 2004 film The Garden of Earthly Delights—that of an art historian dying of cancer—but she left shortly before production began. Cartlidge won a role in 21 Grams but was replaced by Charlotte Gainsbourg due to her death.

Cartlidge died at the age of 41, owing to complications from pneumonia and septicaemia, stemming from a pheochromocytoma.

Legacy
The impact of Cartlidge's sudden death saw the creation of the Katrin Cartlidge Foundation by the trustees Mike Leigh, Peter Gevisser, Simon McBurney, Chris Simon, and Cat Villiers. The patrons include Lars von Trier and Cartlidge's sister Michelle. Established at the Sarajevo Film Festival, an annual bursary is awarded by "an elected curator, chosen by the (Foundation) Trustees from a wide and eclectic number of Katrin Cartlidge’s friends and colleagues...(to) a new creative voice... While the new talent nominated each year will be a filmmaker, it is anticipated that the choices will be as varied and extraordinary as Katrin’s own choice of filmmakers and friends from across the arts."

Mike Leigh: "She took to the improvisation and character work instantly, easily and with extraordinary commitment and imagination. Other than in the Royal Court Young Peoples Theatre, she had had no formal training, but you would never have guessed it. (Drama Centre London turned her down, and that put her off). She often talked to me about [a] move into directing. I am in no doubt that we have lost not only one of our greatest actors but also one of the most interesting new directors of the future."

Following her death, British singer Morrissey dedicated a performance of his song "Late Night, Maudlin Street" at the Royal Albert Hall to Cartlidge, describing her as a "brilliant person and fantastic actor".

Tracy Letts dedicated his 2003 play Man from Nebraska to Cartlidge, stating "Man from Nebraska is dedicated to the memory of my dear friend Katrin Cartlidge".

Filmography 
Film

Television

Television film and short works

References

External links 
 
 
 Career Girl: Tribute to Katrin Cartlidge
 Remembering Katrin Cartlidge

1961 births
2002 deaths
Actresses from London
Deaths from sepsis
English film actresses
English people of German-Jewish descent
English radio actresses
English soap opera actresses
English stage actresses
Infectious disease deaths in England
Jewish English actresses
English Shakespearean actresses
20th-century English actresses
21st-century English actresses